This is a list of mayors of Harare (previously Salisbury until 1982), the capital of Zimbabwe. All mayors are members of the Harare City Council who are elected by their fellow councillors.

List of mayors

See also
 Timeline of Harare

Notes and references

Notes

References 

Mayors
Mayors of Harare
 
Lists of mayors